Alpha and Omega is a 2010 American computer-animated film directed by Anthony Bell and Ben Gluck. Starring the voices of Justin Long, Hayden Panettiere, Dennis Hopper, Danny Glover and Christina Ricci, the film was written by Christopher Denk and Steve Moore, based on a story by Moore and Gluck. This film sets around two young Rocky Mountain wolves named Kate and Humphrey who fall in love with each other, but are on the opposite ends of their pack. However, when Kate and Humphrey learn that they got relocated to Idaho for repopulation, they must work together to get back to Jasper Park before a war slowly begins to emerge between both packs.

The film premiered at the Toronto International Film Festival on September 8, 2010, and was released nationwide in 2-D and 3-D on September 17, 2010, by Lionsgate Films. The film was dedicated to the memory of Dennis Hopper, as he died from prostate cancer four months before it was released, and this was his final performance prior to his death.

Although it received negative reviews, the film eventually turned into a franchise of direct-to-video sequels including Alpha and Omega 2: A Howl-iday Adventure, which was released on October 8, 2013. Another sequel, The Great Wolf Games, was released on March 25, 2014. The Legend of the Saw Tooth Cave was released on September 23, 2014. Family Vacation was released to DVD on August 4, 2015. Dino Digs was released on DVD and Digital HD on May 10, 2016. It was followed by The Big Fur-eeze, which was released on November 8, 2016. The eighth and final installment, Journey To Bear Kingdom was released on DVD and Digital HD on May 9, 2017.

Plot
In Alberta, Canada’s Jasper National Park, Omega wolf Humphrey and his Omega friends slide down a hill on a log. However, the plan goes entirely wrong as they try to maneuver the log down the mountain. Meanwhile, Alpha wolf Kate practices her hunting skills on her younger Omega sister, Lilly, much to her annoyance. Humphrey and Kate join each other mid air, excited to see each other again. However, Humphrey begins to feel nauseated by their spinning, and the two fall onto the ground. As Humphrey tries to join Kate, Winston, leader of the Western pack and Kate’s father, stops Humphrey in pursuing her. He reminds Humphrey that Alphas and Omegas cannot mate according to pack law, and that Kate is going off to Alpha school until Spring. Humphrey looks on, saddened by her departure. 

Spring time comes around, and both Kate and Humphrey mature. Humphrey and his friends seem to master the ways of log boarding, but their fun stops short when they crash into a rock. They then see Kate on her first ever hunt, pursuing a herd of caribou. As Kate and her team close in on the caribou, they are interrupted by a group of two enemy Eastern pack wolves, which causes a stampede. As Kate saves the two Eastern wolves from getting trampled, the Western pack wolves start a fight. Humphrey and his friends then break up the conflict. Later that night, Winston meets up with Eastern pack leader Tony, as they discuss the pack’s food shortage. The two then agree that merging the packs together would end their conflict, and decide that Kate should marry Tony’s Alpha son, Garth. Kate, overhearing their conversation, agrees for the good of the pack.

During the Moonlight Howl (the howling between wolves), Kate and Garth finally meet. Garth tries to show off his howl, but Kate is unimpressed and excuses herself. She then runs into Humphrey, but the two get tranquilized by park rangers and are taken to Sawtooth National Recreation Area in Idaho. The two meet golfing goose Marcel and his duck caddie Paddy. Kate and Humphrey learn that they were relocated to repopulate the species, and agree that they must return home to Jasper Park before the two packs start a war. As the packs discover that Kate has gone missing, Tony warns Winston that if Kate doesn’t return, war will be inevitable. Lilly decides to show Garth around the Western pack’s territory until Kate returns, and the two fall in love.

As Kate and Humphrey catch a ride on an RV, Humphrey has to urinate and gets out while the vehicle pulls over at a nearby gas station. He then finds a cupcake and eats it, as the frosting covers his mouth. Two men mistake him for a wolf with rabies, and they attempt to shoot Humphrey with a gun. Kate then leaps out to save him, and the two flee.
Kate, disappointed that they missed their ride home, leaves Humphrey out in the rain. Now traveling alone in the storm, Kate comes across a dangerous ravine, which has begun to flood. As Kate tries to cross it, she slips, and Humphrey comes to her rescue. Flattered by his bravery, Kate begins to admire Humphrey.

The following day, Marcel and Paddy find the wolves and direct them to a train heading to Jasper Park. Climbing over the snowy mountain, Humphrey finds a grizzly bear cub, and the two play as Kate goes to scout a head. As Humphrey throws snow at the cub, the cub begins to cry, which attracts an angry trio of grizzly bears. As the wolves slide off the side of the mountain, Humphrey and Kate ride on a log and manage to board the train.

As the two joke about their encounter with the bears, Kate and Humphrey begin to bond even closer. Back at home, Lilly compassionately teaches Garth how to howl. At the same time, Humphrey gazes at the full moon and begins to howl, urging Kate to howl with him. Although it is against pack law for an Alpha to howl with an Omega, the two begin to howl, falling in love. As Lilly and Garth finish their howling, Tony catches them, and ultimately declares war on the Western pack. As the train passes by Jasper, Kate and Humphrey’s exchange of feelings is cut short by the sight of the two packs at war. As they return, Kate announces that she will marry Garth to unite the packs. The day of the wedding, a distraught Humphrey bids farewell to Kate, and decides to leave as a lone wolf, much to Kate’s disappointment.

During the ceremony, Kate backs out and declares her love for Humphrey, as Garth subsequently declares his love for Lilly. Tony, enraged, declares war on the Western pack, and a large fight ensues. Their brawl is cut short by an oncoming stampede of caribou, and Winston and Tony get stuck between it. Humphrey and Kate cross paths, and work together by log boarding down the mountain to save them. They succeed, but Kate gets struck by the caribou in the process. As the stampede subsides, Humphrey tries to wake up Kate to no avail. Devastated, Humphrey begins to howl, causing everyone to howl with him. Kate then awakens to everyone’s joy, and she and Humphrey confess their love for each other, as Garth and Lilly confess theirs. Winston and Tony abolish the law against mating between Alphas and Omegas, and accept a union of the two packs via marriage between Garth and Lilly.

At the Moonlight Howl, the wolves celebrate the love of Kate and Humphrey, and Garth and Lilly, breaking the social classes and traditions. The movie ends with Humphrey and Kate howling a duet.

Voice cast

Production
Pre-production and post-production took place in Los Angeles, with key animation produced by Crest Animation Productions in India and the script was written in Toronto, Ontario, Canada. Steve Moore originally intended for the story to be more mature, but Lionsgate wanted the film to be aimed towards children, so the original draft of the script was rewritten.

Reception

Alpha and Omega took in $2,288,773 on its opening day, and $9,106,906 on its opening weekend domestically, reaching fifth place at the box office. The film ended its run on December 2, 2010 after grossing $25 million domestically and $25 million in other territories. It held the title for the highest-grossing animated film released by Lionsgate until 2017, when it was dethroned by My Little Pony: The Movie.

Alpha and Omega holds an approval rating of 19% on Rotten Tomatoes based on 57 reviews; the site's consensus is: "With bland visuals and a dull, predictable plot, Alpha and Omega is a runt in 2010's animated litter." At Metacritic, the film has a score of 36 out of 100 based on reviews from 15 critics, indicating "generally unfavorable" reviews. 
Andrew Barker of Variety gave the film a mixed review, writing: "Not without charm, Lionsgate's 3D animated pic is agreeably unambitious."
Sheri Linden of The Hollywood Reporter wrote: "Abounding in dumb jokes that kids are bound to like but sometimes too scary for very young viewers, the movie -- also going out in 2D -- takes too long to find its footing and at best is proficient, not exhilarating."

Bernie Van De Yacht was nominated for an Artios Award for Outstanding Achievement in Casting.

Marketing

Books
Three books on Alpha and Omega have been published by Finbar and Mindy:
 Kate and Humphrey's Big Adventure/All about Wolves by Rebecca McCarthy
 Alpha and Omega: Marcel and Paddy Save the Day by Tori Kosara
 Alpha and Omega: The Junior Novel by Aaron S. Rosenberg

Video game
Published by Storm City Games, a video game adaptation called Alpha and Omega, based on the first film in the franchise of the same name, was exclusively released for the Nintendo DS on September 14, 2010 and was available in North America and Europe, although certain copies have been imported in other countries. It was panned for its poor graphics, bad controls, repetitive mini-games and lack of story.

Toys
McDonald's released a line of eight toys for the film's release in the United Kingdom.

Release

Home media
Alpha and Omega was released on DVD and Blu-ray Disc on January 11, 2011, which included a coupon for Great Wolf Resorts.

Sequels

A number of direct-to-video sequels to Alpha and Omega have been produced with none of the original cast reprising their roles. Justin Long is replaced by Benjamin Diskin for Humphrey and Hayden Panettiere is replaced by Kate Higgins for Kate.

The first sequel, Alpha and Omega 2: A Howl-iday Adventure, was released on October 8, 2013. The film revolves around the disappearance of Runt, one of Kate and Humphrey's pups in the sequel. DVD Talk stated that Alpha and Omega 2 was "so thin and uninteresting, and so lacking in holiday spirit, that you're not going to be pulling this one out each year when the holidays roll around" and that the film's price combined with its film length made other film choices "even more attractive." Common Sense Media gave the film a 1 out of 5 stars and wrote that the "Faux holiday-themed sequel is weak and forgettable."

Alpha and Omega 3: The Great Wolf Games, based on the Winter Olympics and directed by Richard Rich, was released on iTunes on March 4, 2014, and it was later released on March 25, 2014 as a Walmart Exclusive. Common Sense Media gave Alpha and Omega 3 a mixed review, with three out of five stars, writing that the "mildly amusing sports-themed sequel is fun for young kids." The film was released shortly after the 2014 Winter Olympics in Sochi, Russia, on which it is based.

Alpha and Omega: The Legend of the Saw Tooth Cave was produced by Crest Animation Productions and distributed by Lionsgate Films. Written by Tom Kane and directed by Richard Rich, it is the fourth film in the franchise. The film was released to iTunes on September 23, 2014 and was released to DVD on October 7, 2014. The plot involves Runt exploring the Saw Tooth Cave and finding a wolf who has been driven from her pack for being different. He must help her and he learns about the joys of lending a paw to a friend in need. The trailer for Alpha and Omega: The Legend of the Saw Tooth Cave was released on July 21, 2014. The film was officially announced in the DVD features of Alpha and Omega 2: A Howl-iday Adventure, along with The Great Wolf Games, with director Richard Rich showing two short clips from the storyboards of both films. Common Sense Media gave the film 3 out of 5, stating "Entertaining wolf sequel has peril and some scares".

The fifth film in the franchise, Alpha and Omega: Family Vacation, aired on TV in Mexico on March 28 and was released to DVD on August 4, 2015. It is written by Tom Kane and directed by Richard Rich. It aired in Mexico on March 28, 2015 before having its DVD premiere on August 4. The plot involves Kate, Humphrey, and the pups attempting to have a vacation together, but must flee from human wolf trappers in the process. Common Sense Media gave the film a rating of 3 out of 5 stars, stating "Adorable wolves take on trappers; some peril, suspense."

On April 8, 2015, three more sequels were announced for Lionsgate to distribute, the first of which was released in early 2016, and followed the "misadventures of Alpha Kate and Omega Humphrey and their three wolf pups, Stinky, Claudette and Runt, as they learn life lessons in the great outdoors".

On October 6, 2015, on Splash Entertainment's website, they have revealed the next sequel titled Alpha and Omega: The Big Fureeze along with sneak preview clips of the film, which was released in 2016. The other two sequel titles have also been revealed as, in order, Alpha and Omega: Dino Digs and Alpha and Omega: Journey to Bear Kingdom.

Alpha and Omega: Dino Digs was released on DVD and Digital HD on May 10, 2016. Alpha and Omega: The Big Fureeze was released on DVD and Digital HD on November 8, 2016. Alpha and Omega: Journey to Bear Kingdom was released on May 9, 2017.

References

External links
 
 
 
 

2010 films
2010 computer-animated films
2010s English-language films
2010s American animated films
2010 3D films
Animated films about wolves
American children's animated comedy films
American computer-animated films
American romantic comedy films
Films set in Alberta
Films set in Idaho
Rocky Mountains
Fictional wolves
Lionsgate films
Lionsgate animated films
3D animated films
2010 directorial debut films